, prov. designation: , is a centaur orbiting in the outer Solar System with a perihelion greater than Jupiter and a semi-major axis less than Saturn.

Perihelion

 is listed as a centaur by the Minor Planet Center, Jet Propulsion Laboratory, and the Deep Ecliptic Survey (DES).  Of numbered objects listed as a centaur by all 3 major institutions,  has the smallest perihelion distance.

It came to perihelion in August 2010.

See also

References

External links 
 
 

Centaurs (small Solar System bodies)
Discoveries by the Observatorio Astronómico de Mallorca
20080825